Li Jialun (born 13 January 1993) is a Chinese archer. He competed in the men's individual event at the 2020 Summer Olympics.

In 2014, he competed in the men's individual recurve and men's team recurve events at the 2014 Asian Games held in Incheon, South Korea. In 2018, he won the bronze medal in the men's team recurve event at the 2018 Asian Games held in Jakarta, Indonesia. He also competed in the men's individual recurve and mixed team recurve events.

References

External links
 

1993 births
Living people
Chinese male archers
Archers at the 2014 Asian Games
Archers at the 2018 Asian Games
Asian Games medalists in archery
Asian Games bronze medalists for China
Medalists at the 2018 Asian Games
Olympic archers of China
Archers at the 2020 Summer Olympics
Place of birth missing (living people)
21st-century Chinese people